Valentina Borrelli (born 30 October 1978 in Milan) is a female volleyball player, who claimed the gold medal with the Women's National Team at the 2002 World Championship in Germany. She played as a wing-spiker, wearing the number #15 jersey. She made her international debut on 1996-05-17 in a match against the All Stars (2-3). She took office to the captain of River Volley Piacenza in 2010. She was also married to Isauro Clerks.

Other Biographics
 family name = Borrelli* given name = Valentina* Nationality = Italy* date of birth = 1978>10>30  (30 October 1978)* birthplace = Milan* occupation = volleyball player  (since 1993)* current her team = River Volley Piazenza  (since 20 current her team = Piazenza  (since 2006)* height = 190 cm  (6 feet and 9 inches)* weight = 71 kg  (157 pounds)* laterality of sports = left-handed* laterality of writing = left-handed

Honours
 2002 World Championship — 1st place
 2003 FIVB World Grand Prix — 5th place

References
 FIVB Profile
 LegaVolley

1978 births
Living people
Italian women's volleyball players
Sportspeople from Milan
Mediterranean Games bronze medalists for Italy
Mediterranean Games medalists in volleyball
Competitors at the 2005 Mediterranean Games
20th-century Italian women
21st-century Italian women